The Governor of Kamchatka Krai is the governor of Kamchatka Krai, a federal subject of Russia.

The governor is the highest-ranking official and head of administration of the government of Kamchatka Krai, and is elected for a five-year term that is renewable once consecutively. The office of Governor of Kamchatka Krai was established when Kamchatka Krai was formed on 1 July 2007 as a result of the unification of Kamchatka Oblast and Koryak Autonomous Okrug.

The current governor is Vladimir Solodov of United Russia who took office on 3 April 2020.

Office-holders

Elections 
Vladimir Solodov was appointed by the President of Russian Federation, an election was held on 13 September 2015 for the office:

Sources
 World Statesmen.org

 
Politics of Kamchatka Krai
Kamchatka Krai